Vietnam Post Corporation is the Vietnamese government-owned postal service which was established on 23 March 2005.

Universal Postal Union 
Vietnam joined the Universal Postal Union on 20 October 1951.

History 

The issuer of Vietnamese stamps changed though time, as Vietnam was governed by a variety of states and administrations. The first stamps were introduced by the French colonial administration, only in 1945 stamps specifically for Vietnam were issued. During the decades of conflict and partitioning, stamps were issued by mutually hostile governments. The reunification of Vietnam in 1976 brought about a unified postal service.

References

External links
 

Communications in Vietnam
Postal organizations
Companies of Vietnam